MV Roger Blough is a ship built in 1972 by American Ship Building Company in Lorain, Ohio. She serves as a lake freighter on the Great Lakes. The ship is owned by Great Lakes Fleet, Inc. and is named for the former chairman of U.S. Steel, Roger Blough.

Service history 
The ship's launch was originally planned for July 1971. However, on June 24, 1971, the ship suffered a major engine room fire which killed four and caused serious damage. Sea trials and delivery were delayed by a year to June 1972.

On November 11, 1975, the morning after the sinking, the crew of the Roger Blough recovered a 25-person life raft from the Edmund Fitzgerald.

She was stuck in the ice in Lake Erie near Conneaut, Ohio for eight days in February 1979 and then was laid up from 1981 to 1987 due to the economy and the capacity of the newer  lake freighters.

On May 27, 2016, while under operation of the Keystone Shipping Company, the Roger Blough ran aground on Gros Cap Reef in Whitefish Bay, Lake Superior with some minor flooding reported. She remained aground on May 29, 2016 near Gros Cap Reefs Light with the United States Coast Guard vessel  on station monitoring the situation and enforcing a  safety zone around the vessel. At 5:45 AM on June 3, the Roger Blough began offloading some of its taconite cargo to the SS Philip R. Clarke to lift the ship off the reef. The vessel was refloated off the reef at 10:45 AM, June 4, and anchored at Waiska Bay for further evaluation or repairs. Lightering operations were completed at Waiska Bay on June 7, 2016 with the SS Philip R. Clarke and the  receiving the remainder of the taconite cargo.  Starting off on June 11, 2016, the Roger Blough was escorted  by the tug Candace Elise to Bay Shipbuilding, Sturgeon Bay, Wisconsin for repairs.

Fire in layup 

On February 1, 2021 the vessel was again engulfed in flame from an engine fire while docked at Bay Shipbuilding
No casualties were reported as the ship was empty and in winter layup when the fire started.

According to the National Transportation Safety Board's August 17, 2022, incident report "the probable cause of the engine room fire aboard the bulk carrier Roger Blough was likely the repeated removal and reinstallation of the furnace’s burner that led to the failure of its mounting coupling, resulting in the operating burner dropping to the bottom of its enclosure and fracturing its fuel supply line, which allowed diesel fuel to ignite. Contributing to the casualty was the absence of a fire-activated automatic fuel oil shutoff valve on the fuel oil inlet piping before the burner, which would have stopped the fuel feeding the fire shortly after it started and limited the spread of the fire."

The ship’s future is very unclear (as of November 2021), however there are possible indications, including visible repair efforts to the vessel’s aft section, that the ship is salvageable and the funds needed for repair work ($20 million) are available, barring no additional complications. The NTSB report puts the amount of damage at more than $100 million.

On October 27, 2022, the MV Roger Blough departed Bay Shipbuilding in Sturgeon Bay under tow, destined for Conneaut, OH, for long term layup.

References

External links 

 
 
 Keystone Shipping Company, operator as of 2016.

1972 ships
Ships built in Lorain, Ohio
Great Lakes freighters
Merchant ships of the United States